La La Peace Song is a 1974 album by American singer O. C. Smith. It was produced by Johnny Bristol, Gamble & Huff and Thom Bell, Jerry Fuller and Snuff Garrett. Linda Creed was one of the composers on the album.

Track listing

References

1974 albums
Albums produced by Johnny Bristol